Now & Then is the fifth studio album by the American music duo the Carpenters, released on May 1, 1973. It reached No. 2 on the Billboard Top LPs & Tape chart on July 21, 1973, and ranked No. 20 on the Cash Box year-end pop albums chart. The title, suggested by Karen and Richard's mother Agnes, was taken from a leftover song that did not appear on the album.

Background
As an outgrowth of the Rick Nelson "Garden Party" incident, an oldies revival occurred in pop music around 1973, and Side B of the album is an oldies medley. The medley starts with the Carpenters' original song "Yesterday Once More". Tony Peluso, the Carpenters' guitarist who made his debut on the 1972 album A Song for You, is heard as a radio DJ throughout the medley, which includes such songs as "The End of the World", "Dead Man's Curve", "Johnny Angel" and "One Fine Day". Peluso was also heard as a DJ on the Carpenters' "Calling Occupants of Interplanetary Craft" recording in 1977. The medley also features Mark Rudolph, a cousin of the Carpenters, as the listener who calls in during "Guess the Golden Goodies Group Contest".

Now & Then is one of only two albums for which Karen Carpenter performed all or most of the drumming, the other being Offering (later re-released as Ticket to Ride). She plays all of the drum tracks with the exception of "Jambalaya (On the Bayou)", for which the session drummer Hal Blaine played drums.

The album was released on May 1, 1973, the same day on which the Carpenters performed at the White House following a state dinner for West German chancellor Willy Brandt.

Singles
The album's lead track, "Sing", was written by Sesame Streets frequent composer Joe Raposo. Karen and Richard had first heard the song while on the set of a Robert Young television special. A&M Records did not wish to release it as a single, but Richard insisted, confident it would be a hit. "Sing" reached No. 3 on the Billboard Hot 100 on April 21, 1973.

Richard wrote "Yesterday Once More" after hearing the melody in his head while driving one day. The temporary lyrics for the chorus, which he intended to change later, were kept after the lyricist and former bandmate John Bettis told Richard, "This 'Sha-la-la-wo-wo-wo' stuff sounds pretty good!" The single peaked at No. 2 on July 28, 1973, and became the duo's biggest worldwide hit.

"Yesterday Once More" was issued as a promotional single in the UK in 1973 and "Jambalaya (On the Bayou)" was issued as a promotional single in the UK in 1974.

Cover
The LP album has a three-panel cover that folds out, showing a panoramic view of Karen and Richard Carpenter driving past the Carpenter family home on Newville Avenue in Downey, California. Karen and Richard had bought the five-bedroom house for their parents in 1970. Karen collapsed in the upstairs bedroom of the house while suffering the heart attack that ultimately killed her in 1983. The property also contained an annex, now destroyed, that was Richard and Karen's home studio and housed their awards and certification plaques.

In February 2008, fans created a worldwide awareness campaign about the impending demolition of the Carpenter family house that appears on the album cover, which had become a tourist attraction. The home's owners, who had purchased it in 1997 from Richard Carpenter after his mother's death in 1996, were frustrated with fans coming to the house and asking to be shown around, and they wanted to raze it.

The car pictured on the cover is Richard's 1973 Ferrari 365 GTB/4 ("Daytona"). He later sold the car, but bought another of the same type in 1995.

Track listing

Personnel
Richard Carpenter – keyboards, lead and backing vocals, arranger, orchestration, producer
Karen Carpenter – drums (except on "Jambalaya"), lead and backing vocals, producer
Hal Blaine – drums on "Jambalaya"
Joe Osborn – bass guitar
Bob Messenger – flute, tenor saxophone
Doug Strawn – baritone saxophone
Tom Scott – recorder
Tony Peluso – lead and rhythm guitars, spoken word (DJ) on "Yesterday Once More"
Gary Sims – rhythm guitar
Buddy Emmons – steel guitar
Jay Dee Maness – steel guitar
Earl Dumler – oboe, bass oboe, English horn
The Jimmy Joyce Children's Chorus – backing vocals on "Sing"

Technical
Ray Gerhardt – engineer
Roger Young – assistant engineer
Bernie Grundman – mastering engineer
Roland Young – art direction
Jim McCrary – photography (front cover)
Design Maru – illustrations (front cover)
Len Freas – illustrations (inside cover)
Bernie Grundman, Richard Carpenter – remastering at Bernie Grundman Mastering

Charts

Weekly charts

Year-end charts

Decade-end charts

Certifications

References

1973 albums
The Carpenters albums
A&M Records albums
Albums recorded at A&M Studios